Gravehopping (Slovene: Odgrobadogroba) is a 2005 Slovenian film directed by Jan Cvitkovič. It was Slovenia's submission to the 79th Academy Awards for the Academy Award for Best Foreign Language Film, but was not accepted as a nominee.

See also
List of submissions to the 79th Academy Awards for Best Foreign Language Film

References

External links

2005 comedy-drama films
2005 films
Slovenian comedy-drama films
Slovene-language films
Funerary art
Films about death